Weary Willie's Rags is a 1914 American silent film featuring Oliver Hardy.

Plot

Cast
 Harry Lorraine as Henry Paff
 Ben Walker as William Ragson
 Oliver Hardy as Hotel Clerk (as Babe Hardy)

See also
 List of American films of 1914
 Filmography of Oliver Hardy

External links

1914 films
American silent short films
American black-and-white films
1914 comedy films
1914 short films
Silent American comedy films
American comedy short films
1910s American films